People who served as the mayor of the Municipality of Newtown are:

References

Mayors Newtown
Newtown, Mayors
Mayors of Newtown